Angelo Yonnier Lucena Soteldo (born 26 January 2003) is a Venezuelan footballer who plays as a midfielder for Portuguesa.

Career statistics

Club

Notes

References

2003 births
Living people
Venezuelan footballers
Venezuela youth international footballers
Association football midfielders
Portuguesa F.C. players
Venezuelan Primera División players
People from Guanare
21st-century Venezuelan people